Rade Stanislav Prica (born 30 June 1980) is a Swedish former professional footballer who played as a striker. He is the only player who has won league championships in the three Scandinavian countries – Sweden, Denmark and Norway. He also played in the Bundesliga, the Premier League, and the Israeli Premier League during a career that spanned between 1995 and 2016. A full international between 2001 and 2008, he won 14 caps and scored two goals for the Sweden national team.

Club career

Early career 
Prica started his footballing career as a youth player for Ljungby, he then made his way into the first team, making 37 appearances and scoring 14 goals, over a period of three seasons.

After leaving Ljungby, Prica signed for renowned Swedish club Helsingborg in 1998, he then went on to play for them for five seasons playing 73 times scoring 27 goals, Prica then moved to German team Hansa Rostock.

Prica signed for Aalborg BK in 2006 after being released by Hansa Rostock, During the 2006–07 season, he was topscorer in the Danish Superliga scoring 19 goals.

Sunderland 
Sunderland completed the signing of Prica on 23 January 2008 for a fee of more than £2 million on a three-and-a-half-year contract.

He scored on his debut for at Sunderland against Birmingham City on 29 January 2008, and missed out in scoring a second with referee Mark Halsey ruling it out for handball.

Prica came on as a substitute for Kieran Richardson in a League game against Liverpool at Anfield after just 7 minutes, but was then substituted himself after 56 minutes.

Prica was rarely featured in the Sunderland squad. In January 2009, official sources with the club acknowledged that he was sought by two unnamed British clubs and a European club, rumored to be his previous Danish club Aalborg BK.

Prica was given limited opportunities by Sunderland and did not start a game. It was reported on Sky Sports that Prica had been made available for loan.

Rosenborg 
On 9 March 2009, Prica signed a four-year deal with Rosenborg for £2.3 million. He became the top scorer in the Norwegian top division in the 2009 season, scoring 17 goals in 27 appearances. On 10 April 2011, round three of the 2011 Tippeligaen, Prica scored all four goals for Rosenborg in a 4–4 draw with Lillestrøm SK.

Later career 
On 9 January 2013, it was reported Prica had agreed terms with Maccabi Tel Aviv in the Israeli Premier League. Prica signed in January 2013. Since his arrival to the club he has been very appreciated by either the Israeli fans and media, and had an instant impact for Maccabi Tel Aviv, scoring 8 goals in his first 18 appearances.

On 11 August 2015, he returned to Helsingborg.

International career
Having represented the Sweden U17, U19, and U21 teams, Prica made his full international debut for the Sweden national team on 10 February 2001 in a friendly 4–1 win against Thailand when he played for 66 minutes before being replaced by Martin Åslund. He scored his first goal for Sweden on 18 January 2007 in a friendly 1–2 loss against Ecuador. He made his first and only competitive appearance for Sweden on 8 September 2007 in a UEFA Euro 2008 qualifier against Denmark, coming on a substitute for Zlatan Ibrahimović in the 88th minute of a 0–0 draw. In total, Prica won 14 caps and scored two goals during an international career that spanned between 2001 and 2008.

Personal life
Prica's father is a Serb and his mother is a Croat. Prica's son, Tim Prica, is also a professional footballer. His nephew, Pierre Engvall is a professional hockey player currently employed by the Toronto Maple Leafs of the National Hockey League.

Career statistics

Club

International 

Scores and results list Sweden's goal tally first, score column indicates score after each Prica goal.

Honours
Helsingborgs IF
 Allsvenskan: 1999

Aalborg
 Danish Superliga: 2007–08

Rosenborg
 Tippeligaen: 2009, 2010

Maccabi Tel Aviv
 Israeli Premier League: 2012–13, 2013–14, 2014–15
 Israel State Cup: 2014–15
 Toto Cup: 2014–15

Maccabi Petah Tikva
 Toto Cup: 2015–16
Individual
Danish Superliga Top scorer: 2006–07

 Tippeligaen top scorer: 2009
 Kniksen award: 2009

References

External links
 

1980 births
Living people
Association football forwards
Swedish footballers
Sweden international footballers
Swedish expatriate footballers
Helsingborgs IF players
FC Hansa Rostock players
AaB Fodbold players
Sunderland A.F.C. players
Rosenborg BK players
Maccabi Tel Aviv F.C. players
Maccabi Petah Tikva F.C. players
Landskrona BoIS players
Allsvenskan players
Ettan Fotboll players
Division 3 (Swedish football) players
Premier League players
Eliteserien players
Danish Superliga players
Bundesliga players
2. Bundesliga players
Israeli Premier League players
Expatriate footballers in England
Expatriate men's footballers in Denmark
Expatriate footballers in Germany
Expatriate footballers in Norway
Expatriate footballers in Israel
Sweden under-21 international footballers
Swedish people of Serbian descent
Swedish people of Croatian descent
Serb diaspora sportspeople